Posey County is the southernmost, southwesternmost, and westernmost county in the U.S. state of Indiana. Its southern border is formed by the Ohio River, and its western border by the Wabash River, a tributary to the Ohio. As of 2010, the population was 25,910. The county seat is Mount Vernon.

Posey County is part of the Evansville, IN–KY Metropolitan Statistical Area. The Ports of Indiana-Mt. Vernon, on the Ohio River, is the seventh largest inland port complex in the nation. Mechanization of dock technology has altered the number of workers at the port, but Posey County is still the seventh-largest internal port in the United States, based on the tons of materials handled. Grain from the Midwest is among the products shipped.

History
After the American Revolutionary War, Posey County was originally considered part of the Northwest Territory, organized in 1787 by the new United States. As part of the Indiana Territory, it was organized in November 1814 from Gibson and Warrick counties. It was named for Revolutionary War Gen. Thomas Posey, who was then serving as Governor of the Territory. Mount Vernon was designated as the county seat in 1825. Its port on the Ohio River continues to be integral to the economy of the state and county.

Like other parts of southern Ohio, Indiana and Illinois, Posey County was first settled by people from the Upper South, many of whom arrived via the Ohio River. Farming was the primary development at first. In the mid- to late 19th century, the county received many German immigrants. The river port had rougher areas of vice, and a higher population of single men, as was typical. African Americans were among the men who worked on ships and at the port.

Posey County was the site of the largest recorded lynching of African Americans in Indiana's history. In October 1878, a white mob lynched seven Black men in the span of a few days. No one in the mob was prosecuted, and at each court session for the next three years, the prosecutor asked the judge to "set the case over to the next session". A grand jury was called to investigate the mob action, but with an election pending for the prosecuting attorney, no one was ever indicted. Following years of research, Posey County judge Jim Redwine wrote a novel, Judge Lynch! (2008), based on the events. Redwine sometimes lectures on the riot, inviting his audience to imagine how they would have acted and stressing the injustice done to the African Americans who were denied the right to a fair trial.

Geography
The low rolling hills of SW Indiana are carved by drainages; the Black River flows southwestward through the county's upper portion, discharging into the Wabash River north of New Harmony. Rush Creek drains the county's central portion, flowing westward to discharge into the Wabash in Harmonie State Park. The area is largely cleared and devoted to agriculture or urban use, although the drainages and lowlands are still wooded or brush-filled.

The lowest point in the state of Indiana is located on the Ohio River in Posey County, where the Wabash River flows into it, and Posey County's highest point ( ASL) is a small rise  SSW from Saint Wendel, near the county's southeast corner.
Posey county lies at the tripoint of Indiana, Kentucky and Illinois.

Adjacent counties

 White County, Illinois (west and northwest across intermittent sections of water and land boundaries)
 Gallatin County, Illinois (southwest also over intermittent sections of water and land boundaries)
 Gibson County (north and northeast)
 Posey County
 Union County, Kentucky (south, with some land boundaries on Indiana side)
 Vanderburgh County (east)
 Henderson County, Kentucky (southeast also with some land boundaries on Indiana side)

Cities and towns

 Cynthiana - town
 Griffin - town
 Mount Vernon - city/county seat
 New Harmony - town
 Poseyville - town

Townships

 Bethel
 Black
 Center
 Harmony
 Lynn
 Marrs
 Point
 Robb
 Robinson
 Smith

Unincorporated places

 Barrett
 Blairsville
 Bufkin
 Caborn
 Dead Mans Crossing
 Erwin
 Farmersville
 Grafton
 Hepburn
 Heusler
 Hovey
 Lippe
 Marrs Center
 New Baltimore
 Oak Grove
 Oliver
 Parkers Settlement - census-designated place
 Philip Station
 Prairie
 Rapture
 Saint Philip
 Saint Wendel
 Savah
 Solitude
 Springfield
 Stewartsville
 Upton
 Wadesville
 Welborn Switch
 West Franklin

Protected areas
 Harmonie State Park
 Wabash Lowlands Wetland Conservation Area

Transportation

Major highways

Railroads
 CSX Transportation
 Evansville Western Railway

River ports
 Ports of Indiana-Mt. Vernon is "the 7th largest inland port [complex] in the United States and serves as a major multi-modal hub for the region." It handles more than 4 million trip tons of cargo annually. Southwind Maritime Center is the name of a related port facility, now considered within the complex. This port facility is important to the economy of the state of Indiana as well as to Posey County. It handles shipping of grain, grain products, coal, fertilizer, cement and minerals, from a region that produces a large amount of grain. This is the largest public port within 175 miles of the confluence of the Ohio and Mississippi rivers.

Climate and weather

Government

The county government is a constitutional body, and is granted specific powers by the Constitution of Indiana, and by the Indiana Code.

County Council: The legislative branch of the county government; controls spending and revenue collection in the county. Representatives are elected to four-year terms from single-member districts of roughly equal population in the county. They set salaries, the annual budget, and special spending. The council has limited authority to impose local taxes, in the form of an income and property tax that is subject to state level approval, excise taxes, and service taxes.

Board of Commissioners: The executive body of the county is a three-person board of commissioners, who are elected at-large (county-wide), to staggered four-year terms. One commissioner serves as president. The commissioners execute acts legislated by the council, collect revenue, and manage the county government.

Court: The county maintains a small claims court that handles civil cases. The court judge is elected to a four-year term and must be a member of the Indiana Bar Association. The judge is assisted by a constable, who is also elected to a four-year term. In some cases, court decisions can be appealed to the state level circuit court.

County Officials: Other county elected offices include sheriff, coroner, auditor, treasurer, recorder, surveyor, and circuit court clerk Each serves a four-year term. Members elected to county government positions are required to declare party affiliations and to be residents of the county.

Demographics

As of the 2010 United States Census, there were 25,910 people, 10,171 households, and 7,442 families in the county. The racial makeup of the county was 97.2% white, 0.9% black or African American, 0.3% Asian, 0.2% American Indian, 0.4% from other races, and 1.1% from two or more races. Those of Hispanic or Latino origin made up 1.0% of the population. In terms of ancestry, 43.6% were German, 13.6% were American, 11.6% were Irish, and 11.2% were English.

Of the 10,171 households, 32.7% had children under the age of 18 living with them, 60.4% were married couples living together, 8.5% had a female householder with no husband present, 26.8% were non-families, and 23.3% of all households were made up of individuals. The average household size was 2.52 and the average family size was 2.97. The median age was 41.6 years.

The median income for a household in the county was $47,697 and the median income for a family was $68,722. Males had a median income of $55,786 versus $32,747 for females. The per capita income for the county was $26,727. About 6.0% of families and 8.3% of the population were below the poverty line, including 12.2% of those under age 18 and 8.3% of those age 65 or over.

Education
 Mount Vernon High School - Mt. Vernon
 North Posey High School - Poseyville

Tourism & recreation

 Posey County Stockyard
 Visit Posey County - Posey County
 Brittlebank Park - Mount Vernon
 Harmonie State Park - New Harmony
 Hovey Lake State Fish & Wildlife Area - Mount Vernon 
 New Harmony Historic District - New Harmony
 Sherburne Park - Mount Vernon

Representation in other media
 Posey County Judge James M. Redwine wrote a novel, Judge Lynch! (2008), based on the 1878 lynchings of seven African-American men in Mt. Vernon.

See also

 Erie Canal Soda Pop Festival - Griffin, Indiana.
 National Register of Historic Places listings in Posey County, Indiana

References

External links

 Official website
 

 
Indiana counties
1814 establishments in Indiana Territory
Populated places established in 1814
Indiana counties on the Ohio River
Evansville metropolitan area
Southwestern Indiana